Cyclothone atraria, commonly known as the deep-water bristlemouth, is a species of ray-finned fish in the genus Cyclothone. It is found in the North Pacific.

References

Gonostomatidae
Fish described in 1905